David VII, also known as David Ulu (1215–1270), from the Bagrationi dynasty, was king of Georgia from 1247 to 1270, jointly with his namesake cousin, David VI, from 1247 to 1259, when David VI, revolting from the Mongol hegemony, seceded in the western moiety of the kingdom, while David VII was relegated to the rule of eastern Georgia. During his reign, Georgia went into further decline under the Mongol overlordship.

Early life and diarchy
David was a son of King Giorgi IV Lasha by a non-noble woman. Fearing that he would pretend to the throne, his aunt, Queen Rusudan held him prisoner at the court of her son-in-law, the sultan Kaykhusraw II for nearly seven years, and sent her son David to the Mongol court to get his official recognition as heir apparent. Following Kaykhusraw's defeat by the Mongols, David, son of Giorgi, was set free in 1242. In 1246, he was selected as king by the Georgian nobles who believed that his cousin David VI, son of Rusudan, had died in 1244. Following the coronation at Svetitskhoveli Cathedral, Mtskheta, he was sent to the Great Khan Güyük Khan to receive an official recognition. Held at Karakorum for five years, he met his cousin David there. Finally, Güyük Khan recognized David (Lasha Giorgi’s son) as senior joint sovereign and appointed another David (Rusudan’s son) junior co-ruler. Thereafter known as David VII Ulu (i.e. "the senior") and David VI Narin (i.e. "the junior"), the cousins ruled jointly for years.

Decline of the kingdom
In 1256, David Ulu with the Georgian auxiliaries took part in Mongol conquest of Alamut. In 1259, David Narin rose, unsuccessfully, against the Mongol yoke and, then, fled to Kutaisi, whence he reigned over western Georgia (Imereti) as an independent ruler. In 1260, Hulagu Khan requested that David Ulu supported him in the war against Egypt. David, remembering the Georgian losses at Baghdad (1258) refused to comply and revolted. A huge army of Mongols led by Arghun Noyan attacked the southern Georgian province of Samtskhe, defeated the king and his spasalar (general) Sargis Jakeli of Samtskhe, but could not capture the rebels’ main strongholds and left the country in June 1261. Nevertheless, the forces were unequal and David Ulu had to take refuge at his cousin, David VI Narin’s court at Kutaisi. His family was captured and David's wife Gvantsa killed by the Mongols. In 1262, he had to make peace with the Mongols and returned to Tbilisi, effectively splitting the country into two parts with both rulers titled as kings of Georgia.

Later life 
By the Ilkhan request, David Ulu's army was dispatched to defend the fortifications of Siba against the Golden Horde in 1263. In 1265, the Georgian forces serving as a vanguard of the Ilkhanid army, defeated Berke, Khan of the Golden Horde, and expelled his troops from Shirvan. A heavy burden of Mongol dominance led to a political and economic crisis in the kingdom. As a result of a dispute with the royal court, the province of Samtskhe seceded and submitted directly to the Ilkhan rule in 1266. Thus, Georgia further disintegrated to form three separate political entities.

David VII Ulu died of a bowel infection at the age of 55 in the spring of 1270. He was buried at Mtskheta. He was succeeded by his son Demetre II.

Marriage and children
He was married four times. His first wife, Jigda-Khatun, either a Mongol woman or a daughter of the Sultan of Rum, died in 1252. In the meantime (1249/50), he bigamously contracted a union with an Alan woman, Altun, whom he repudiated in 1252. His third wife Gvantsa, widow of the Georgian noble Avag Mkhargrdzeli and daughter of Kakhaber, eristavi (duke) of Racha and Takveri, was executed on the orders of Hulagu Khan in 1262. In 1263, David married Esukan, daughter of the Mongol noyan Chormaqan.

He had two sons and two daughters, including:
Giorgi (1250–1268) (by Altun), heir apparent, died before his father's death in 1268,
Tamar (by Altun) was married twice: a son of Arghun noyan in c. 1273, and later the Georgian noble Sadun of Mankaberdi, regent of the kingdom in 1269–1278.
Demetre (by Gvantsa) succeeded him in 1270.

References

External links

History of Georgia – XIII-XV centuries

Kings of Georgia
1215 births
1270 deaths
Eastern Orthodox monarchs
Bagrationi dynasty of the Kingdom of Georgia
Illegitimate children of Georgian monarchs
13th-century people from Georgia (country)